The Happy Sad is a 2013 film directed by Rodney Evans, based on a play of the same name by Ken Urban. It follows the interacting journeys of two young couples in New York City who decide to push the boundaries of relationships and sexuality.

The film premiered at the 2013 Frameline Film Festival.

Plot
In New York City, young schoolteacher Annie tells her musician boyfriend Stan that she wants to take a break. Meanwhile, Marcus and Aaron are two young men who have been in a committed relationship for six years, and decide to try an open relationship. Both Stan and Annie end up experimenting with same-sex encounters, with the former meeting Marcus online and hooking up; eventually Aaron walks in on them and becomes increasingly hurt and insecure as he discovers that Marcus is falling for Stan. After Annie goes on a blind date with an older man, she eventually gets together with fellow schoolteacher Mandy, who has been her confidante. After some soul searching and several explosive encounters, Stan and Annie return to each other, as do Marcus and Aaron, while Mandy meets a new partner.

Cast
Leroy McClain as Marcus
 Sorel Carradine as Annie
 Charlie Barnett as Aaron
 Cameron Scoggins as Stan
 Maria Dizzia as Mandy
 Sue Jean Kim as Alice
 Jamie Harrold as Neil
 Michael Nathanson as David

References

External links
 

2013 films
American LGBT-related films
American drama films
American independent films
2013 LGBT-related films
LGBT-related drama films
2013 independent films
2013 drama films
2010s English-language films
2010s American films